The men's marathon at the 1972 Summer Olympics in Munich, West Germany was held on Sunday September 10, 1972. The race started at 15:00h local time. There were 74 competitors from 39 countries. Twelve of them did not finish. The maximum number of athletes per nation had been set at 3 since the 1930 Olympic Congress. The event was won by Frank Shorter of the United States, the nation's first Olympic marathon victory since 1908 and third overall (matching France and Ethiopia for most golds in the event). Karel Lismont won Belgium's second medal in the marathon with his silver (after a bronze in 1948). Mamo Wolde of Ethiopia became only the second man, after his countryman Abebe Bikila, to win two medals in the marathon. Ethiopia's four-Games medal streak was matched only by Finland (1920–1932).

Summary

Frank Shorter, who was born in Munich, became the first American in 64 years to win the Olympic marathon, moving into the lead at 15km and never being challenged. 

Unfortunately, Shorter was not the first runner to enter the Olympic stadium, as West German student Norbert Südhaus had run onto the Olympic course wearing a West German track uniform, and ran the last kilometre, including a full lap of the stadium. Thinking that Südhaus was the winner, the crowd began cheering him before officials realized the hoax. Shorter arrived 35 seconds later, as Südhaus was being escorted off the track by security, and was perplexed to see someone ahead of him, and to hear the booing and jeering (meant for Südhaus).

This was the third time in Olympic history that an American had won the marathon, after Thomas Hicks in 1904 and Johnny Hayes in 1908, and in none of those three instances did the winner enter the stadium first: Hicks, like Shorter, was preceded by a hoaxer, whereas Hayes was declared the winner after Dorando Pietri of Italy was disqualified for receiving illegal assistance.

Background

This was the 17th appearance of the event, which is one of 12 athletics events to have been held at every Summer Olympics. Returning runners from the 1968 marathon included defending champion Mamo Wolde (who had also run in 1964, along with his brother Demissie Wolde, who returned in 1972 after not competing in 1968), silver medalist Kenji Kimihara of Japan, fourth-place finisher İsmail Akçay of Turkey, seventh-place finisher Derek Clayton of Australia, and ninth-place finisher Akio Usami of Japan. Frank Shorter of the United States was favored after winning the Pan-American and Fukuoka marathons.

Bolivia, Haiti, North Korea, Malawi, Nicaragua, Somalia, Sri Lanka, Sudan, and Swaziland each made their first appearance in Olympic marathons. The United States made its 17th appearance, the only nation to have competed in each Olympic marathon to that point.

Competition format and course

As all Olympic marathons, the competition was a single race. The marathon distance of 26 miles, 385 yards was run over a route created to resemble the mascot, Waldi. The course was arranged so that the head of the dog faced west, with athletes running counter-clockwise, starting at the back of the dog's neck and continuing around the ears. The mouth of the dog was represented by the path through the Nymphenburg Park, and its front feet were represented by the run through the Hirschgarten. The belly was the main downtown street in Munich, and its rear feet, rear end and tail were all in the English Garden, a parkland extending along the Isar River. The athletes continued along the back of the dog and entered the Olympic Stadium.

Records

These were the standing world and Olympic records prior to the 1972 Summer Olympics.

No new world or Olympic bests were set during the competition.

Schedule

All times are Central European Time (UTC+1)

Results

References

External links
  Marathon Info

M
Marathons at the Olympics
Men's marathons
Oly
Men's events at the 1972 Summer Olympics